Can You Feel It may refer to:

Albums
 Can You Feel It by Angel, 1989
 Can You Feel It? (EP) by Highlight, 2017
Can You Feel It, a 1972 album by S.O.U.L.
Can You Feel It, a 1973 album by Lighthouse

Songs
 "Can You Feel It" (The Jacksons song), 1981
 "Can You Feel It" (Larry Heard song), 1986
 "Can You Feel It" (Ross Lynch song), 2012
 "Can You Feel It" (Timomatic song), 2012
 "Can You Feel It" (DNCE song), 2017
 "Can You Feel It", a 1977 song by Angel from their album On Earth as It Is in Heaven
 "Can You Feel It", a 2004 song by Jean-Roch (Arrangement from Rocky OST - "Going the Distance")
 "Can You Feel It", a 2014 song by RapScallions
 "Can You Feel It", a 2016 song by Pentagon from the EP Five Senses
 "Can U Feel It", a 1997 song by 3rd Party
 "Can U Feel It", a 2017 song from My Little Pony: The Movie